Kamareh-ye Sofla (also Romanized as Kamareh-ye Soflá; also known as Kamārah) is a village in Shiyan Rural District, in the Central District of Eslamabad-e Gharb County, lorestan Province, Iran. At the 2006 census, its population was 584, in 122 families.

References 

Populated places in Eslamabad-e Gharb County